Matej Paulovič (born 13 January 1995) is a Slovak professional ice hockey player who is currently playing for HC Dynamo Pardubice in the Czech Extraliga (ELH). He was selected by the Dallas Stars in the fifth round, 149th overall, of the 2013 NHL Entry Draft.

Playing career
Paulovič signed as a free agent to a  three-year optional contract with Mountfield HK of the ELH, on May 23, 2018. He joined the Czech club after spending his first two professional seasons in Slovakia with HC Nové Zámky and HK Nitra of the Tipsport Liga (Slovak).

International play
Paulovič competed in the 2018 Winter Olympics.

Career statistics

Regular season and playoffs

International

References

External links

1995 births
Living people
Sportspeople from Topoľčany
Slovak ice hockey left wingers
Olympic ice hockey players of Slovakia
Ice hockey players at the 2018 Winter Olympics
Dallas Stars draft picks
HK Nitra players
Peterborough Petes (ice hockey) players
Muskegon Lumberjacks players
HC Nové Zámky players
Stadion Hradec Králové players
LHK Jestřábi Prostějov players
HC Dynamo Pardubice players
HC Vrchlabí players
Slovak expatriate ice hockey players in the Czech Republic
Slovak expatriate ice hockey players in the United States
Slovak expatriate ice hockey players in Canada
Slovak expatriate ice hockey players in Sweden